Bill Marsilii (born 1962) is an American screenwriter.

Marsilii was born in Wilmington, Delaware. After graduating with a degree in drama from New York University's Tisch School of the Arts, where he attended Circle in the Square Theatre School, he founded a theater company called Bad Neighbor and performed solo comedy in Manhattan.

His spec script for Déjà Vu, written with Terry Rossio, sold for $3 million against $5 million, setting a record at the time for the highest price ever paid for a screenplay. Since then, he has been credited as a screenwriter on such projects as the upcoming adaptation of The Wind in the Willows and 20,000 Leagues Under the Sea: Captain Nemo.

Filmography (partial listing) 
 2006 Déjà Vu (screenwriter)
 1999–2002 Courage the Cowardly Dog (writer; 6 episodes)

References

External links 
 

1962 births
American male screenwriters
Tisch School of the Arts alumni
Living people
Writers from Wilmington, Delaware
Screenwriters from Delaware